Clitocybe fragrans is a white mushroom with a "fragrant" (fragrans) odor of aniseed and can be confused with the aniseed toadstool. While edible, it should be avoided as it can be confused with deadly poisonous species, including Clitocybe dealbata (which lacks the anise odor). It also resembles Clitocybe odora.

References

External links
 Clitocybe fragrans

fragans
Edible fungi
Fungi described in 1792
Fungi of Europe